Mokri Potok (earlier Spodnji Vecenbah Spodnji Vencenbah, or Brusni potok) is a village in the Municipality of Kočevje in southern Slovenia. The area is part of the traditional region of Lower Carniola and is now included in the Southeast Slovenia Statistical Region. It no longer has any permanent residents.

Name
The Slovene name Mokri Potok literally means 'wet stream' and may be an ironic name because the watercourse with the same name is often dry. The German name Unterwetzenbach (literally, 'lower Wetzenbach) is paired with neighboring Oberwetzenbach (literally, 'upper Wetzenbach), which is named Sadni Hrib in Slovene. The origin of the name Wetzenbach is uncertain. The most common explanation is that it refers to the surname Wetz (i.e., 'Wetz's Creek'), which was attested in the Gottschee area. Another theory holds that the name Wetzenbach is a corruption of Weiss Bach 'White Creek'. The Slovenian name Brusni potok (literally, 'whetting steam') was used in prewar Yugoslavia and was a mistranslation of the German name, mistaking the modifier Wetzen- for the verb wetzen 'to whet, hone'.

History
Mokri Potok was a Gottschee German village. In the land registry of 1498 it had three full farms divided into six half-farms. In the land registry of 1574 there were four half-farms as well as a full farm owned by the mayor. Before the Second World War the village had 19 houses. The village was not destroyed during the war, when its original inhabitants were expelled. The last residents abandoned the village in 1965.

References

External links
Mokri Potok on Geopedia
Pre–World War II list of oeconyms and family names in Mokri Potok

Former populated places in the Municipality of Kočevje